The Kihikihi Polo Club is a historic polo club in Kihikihi, New Zealand. Founded in 1892, it has hosted many international tournaments, including the Waikato Open and the New Zealand Savile Cup.

Location
The club is located in Kihikihi, a rural part of New Zealand.

History
The club was founded by the Kay family in 1892. It has been affiliated with the Auckland Provincial Polo Association and New Zealand Polo Association since 1910. It was located at the Greenhill Estate, owned by William Taylor. It then moved to Orakau, Waikeria and Parawera.

In 1946, it moved to the Kihikihi Domain, the current location. There are three polo grounds.

The club hosts many national and international matches. In 1981, it hosted a match with an American team comprising Steve Flores, Joel Baker, Mike Conant and Peter Baldwin. In 2008, the club hosted the first international test match of the year. The England team (James Beim, Mark Tomlinson, Malcolm Borwick, Tom Morley) lost to the All Blacks team (Tommy Wilson, Craig Wilson, John Paul Clarkin, Simon Keyte). In 2014, it hosted the Waikato Open. That year, it also hosted the New Zealand Savile Cup.

Bibliography
Archie Kay. The Kihikihi Polo Club, 1892-1992. The club, 1992. 120 pages.

References

Polo clubs
Polo in New Zealand
Sports clubs in New Zealand
Sports clubs established in 1892
1892 establishments in New Zealand